Oryzias carnaticus or the spotted ricefish are a freshwater–brackish fish species native to the India, Bangladesh, Sri Lanka, and Myanmar. Their maximum length is only . They are normally found near the coast, and can live in fresh water and brackish water.

References

carnaticus
Freshwater fish of Sri Lanka
Taxa named by Thomas C. Jerdon
Fish described in 1849